Alanna Kraus (born June 30, 1977 in Abbotsford, British Columbia) is a Canadian short track speed skater.  She won the bronze medal at the 2002 Winter Olympics in short-track speed skating for the women's 3000 m relay. She competed in three individual events at the 2002 Games. In the 500 m she placed 6th; 8th in the 1000 m and 5th in the 1500 m.
She was also a silver medallist at the 2000 Goodwill Games.

In the 2006 Winter Olympics she won silver as part of the short track relay team in the 3000 meter race with Tania Vicent, Kalyna Roberge, and Anouk Leblanc-Boucher. In her only individual event at the Games, the 500  she placed 9th. She won a silver medal in the relay event at the 2006 World Championships.

Personal life
Kraus first started speed skating at age four.  She is one of many Olympic athletes to come from the National Sport School based in Calgary, Alberta.

References

1977 births
Canadian female speed skaters
Canadian female short track speed skaters
Living people
Medalists at the 2002 Winter Olympics
Medalists at the 2006 Winter Olympics
Olympic bronze medalists for Canada
Olympic medalists in short track speed skating
Olympic short track speed skaters of Canada
Olympic silver medalists for Canada
Sportspeople from Abbotsford, British Columbia
Short track speed skaters at the 2002 Winter Olympics
Short track speed skaters at the 2006 Winter Olympics
World Short Track Speed Skating Championships medalists
21st-century Canadian women